Samar  was a  province in the Philippines which is coterminous with the island of Samar and its outlying islands.

History  
It was established in 1768 after it got separated from the province of Leyte.

On June 19, 1965, the Philippine Congress along with the three Samar Representatives, Eladio T. Balite (1st District), Fernando R. Veloso (2nd District) and Felipe J. Abrigo (3rd District), approved Republic Act No. 4221 dividing the province of Samar into three divisions: Northern Samar, Eastern Samar, and Western Samar. Each province adopted a new capital: Catbalogan (Western Samar), Borongan (Eastern Samar), and Catarman (Northern Samar). On June 21, 1969, under Republic Act No. 5650, Western Samar was renamed simply into Samar with Catbalogan still as the capital.

See also
Samar
Samar (province)
Northern Samar
Eastern Samar

References

Former provinces of the Philippines
States and territories established in 1768
States and territories disestablished in 1965
1768 establishments in the Spanish Empire